Abraham Guloyan was an Armenian politician.

Biography 

Born in 1893 in Salmas province in Persia. Studied in Gevorgian Seminary of Etchmiadzin, then continued his studies in the universities of Moscow and Petrograd.

Was the rector of communistic university of Transcaucasia, then the president of State Planning Commission of ASSR, and then in 1935 the president of the Council.

His tenure coincided with the saddest years of USSR, the beginning of violence, when the brightest individuals of USSR were “beheaded”, when the whole country became one traitor camp, when stones were being thrown at everyone and everything, otherwise you would be on the guillotine.

Guloyan had his duties at that time, with Beria and his followers he also had to struggle against Aghasi Khanjyan, because of which one of the brightest individuals on Armenia committed "suicide

Neither Guloyan was spared by the guillotine of person cult: he perished by Stalin’s order in 1937.

References 

Heads of government of the Armenian Soviet Socialist Republic
1893 births
1938 deaths
People from Salmas
Persian Armenians
Iranian emigrants to the Soviet Union
Soviet Armenians
Great Purge victims